Albert Bel Fay (February 26, 1913 in New Orleans – February 29, 1992 in Cuernavaca, Morelos, Mexico) was a businessman, Republican party leader, and United States ambassador to Trinidad and Tobago (1976–1977).

He and his family moved to Houston in 1928. There he attended San Jacinto High School. In 1936, he graduated with a B.S. in geology from Yale University, where he was a member of St. Anthony Hall.

He was commissioned as an ensign in the United States Naval Reserve. During World War II, Fay commanded a submarine chaser, served on the staff of the Submarine Chaser Training Center in Miami and then as first lieutenant on USS Yokes at Okinawa.

Fay and his brother founded Seabrook Shipyard in 1938 and built submarine chasers and rescue boats during World War II. During his business career, he went on to found and serve as a business executive in several businesses including being the cofounder, vice president, and director of the family-owned Bel Oil Corporation.

He was a member of the Republican National Committee from Texas and a delegate to Republican National Convention from Texas, 1960. He was the U.S. Ambassador to Trinidad and Tobago from 1976-77.

References

Yale College alumni
San Jacinto High School  alumni
People from New Orleans
People from Houston
American company founders
American shipbuilders
Ambassadors of the United States to Trinidad and Tobago